Ján Solovič (8 March 1934 – 10 July 2022) was a Slovak writer, playwright, and politician. He served on the Slovak National Council from 1971 to 1990.

Solovič died in Vysoké Tatry on 10 July 2022 at the age of 88.

References

 
1934 births
2022 deaths
Slovak writers
Slovak dramatists and playwrights
Merited Artists of Czechoslovakia
People from Zvolen District